The Palme d'Or is the highest prize awarded at the Cannes Film Festival. It was introduced in 1955 by the festival's organizing committee. Previously, from 1939 to 1954, the festival's highest prize was the Grand Prix du Festival International du Film. In 1964, The Palme d'Or was replaced again by the Grand Prix, before being reintroduced in 1975.

The Palme d'Or is widely considered one of the film industry's most prestigious awards.

History 

In 1954, the festival decided to present an award annually, titled the Grand Prix of the International Film Festival, with a new design each year from a contemporary artist. The festival's board of directors invited several jewellers to submit designs for a palm, in tribute to the coat of arms of the city of Cannes, evoking the famous legend of Saint Honorat and the palm trees lining the famous Promenade de la Croisette. The original design by Parisian jeweller Lucienne Lazon, inspired by a sketch by director Jean Cocteau, had the bevelled lower extremity of the stalk forming a heart, and the pedestal a sculpture in terracotta by the artist Sébastien.

In 1955, the first Palme d'Or was awarded to Delbert Mann for his film Marty. From 1964 to 1974, the festival temporarily resumed a Grand Prix. In 1975, the Palme d'Or was reintroduced and has since remained the festival's symbol, awarded each year to the director of the winning film, presented in a case of pure red Morocco leather lined with white suede.

As of 2021, Jane Campion and Julia Ducournau are the only female directors to win the Palme d'Or (for The Piano and Titane, respectively). However, 2013, when Blue Is the Warmest Color won the Palme d'Or, the Steven Spielberg-headed jury awarded it to the film's actresses Adèle Exarchopoulos and Léa Seydoux as well as director Abdellatif Kechiche, the only time multiple Palme d'Or trophies have been awarded. The jury decided to present it to the actresses as well due to a Cannes policy forbidding the Palme d'Or-winning film from receiving any additional awards, which would have prevented the jury from recognizing the actresses separately. Of the unorthodox decision, Spielberg said, "Had the casting been 3% wrong, [the film] wouldn't have worked like it did for us". Kechiche later auctioned off his Palme d'Or trophy to fund his new feature film, and, in an interview with The Hollywood Reporter, expressed dissatisfaction that the festival had awarded multiple trophies. He said he felt they had "publicly insulted" him by doing it, and that "liberating myself from this Palme d’Or is a way of washing my hands of this sorry affair".

Since its reintroduction, the prize has been redesigned several times. At the beginning of the 1980s, the rounded shape of the pedestal, bearing the palm has gradually transformed to become pyramidal in 1984. In 1992, Thierry de Bourqueney redesigned the Palme and its pedestal in hand-cut crystal. In 1997, Caroline Scheufele redesigned the statuette; since then, it has been manufactured by the Swiss jewellery firm Chopard. The Palme d’or rests on a dainty crystal cushion shaped like an emerald-cut diamond. A single piece of cut crystal forms a cushion for the palm, which is hand-cast into a wax mould and now presented in a case of blue Morocco leather. In 1998, Theo Angelopoulos was the first director to win the Palme d'or as it appears today, for his film Eternity and a Day.

The presentation of the 2014 Palme d'Or to Winter Sleep, a Turkish film by Nuri Bilge Ceylan, occurred during the 100th anniversary year of Turkish cinema. On receiving the award, Ceylan dedicated it to the "young people" involved in Turkey's ongoing political unrest, and the workers killed in the Soma mine disaster, which occurred on the day before the commencement of the awards event.

In 2017, the award was redesigned to celebrate the festival's 70th anniversary. The diamonds were provided by an ethical supplier certified by the Responsible Jewellery Council.

The 2020 Cannes Film Festival was cancelled due to the ongoing COVID-19 pandemic. 56 films were announced as official selections by the festival, but no awards were presented.

Winners 

 Notes

 # Denotes ex aequo win
 § Denotes unanimous win
 ‡ The Palme d'Or for Union Pacific was awarded in retrospect at the 2002 festival. The festival's debut was to take place in 1939, but it was cancelled due to World War II. The organisers of the 2002 festival presented part of the original 1939 selection to a professional jury of six members. The films were: Boefje, The Four Feathers, Goodbye Mr. Chips, Lenin in 1918, La Loi du Nord, Union Pacific & The Wizard of Oz.

Multiple winners 

Nine directors or co-directors have won the award twice. Three of these (‡) have won for consecutive films.

 Alf Sjöberg (1946 & 1951) 
 Francis Ford Coppola (1974 & 1979) 
 Bille August (1988 & 1992) 
 Emir Kusturica (1985 & 1995) 
 Shohei Imamura (1983 & 1997) 
 Jean-Pierre & Luc Dardenne (1999 & 2005) 
 Michael Haneke (2009 & 2012) 
 Ken Loach (2006 & 2016) 
 Ruben Östlund (2017 & 2022)

Honorary Palme d'Or 

In 1997, on the occasion of the 50th anniversary of the Festival, the Cannes jury awarded a "Palme des Palmes" for the first time.

In 2002 the festival began to sporadically award a non-competitive Honorary Palme d'Or to directors or actors who had achieved a notable body of work but who had never won a competitive Palme d'Or.

In 2018, the Cannes jury also awarded a "Special Palme d'Or" for the first time.

See also 

 List of actors who have appeared in multiple Palme d'Or winners
 Golden Bear, the highest prize awarded at the Berlin Film Festival
 Golden Lion, the highest prize awarded at the Venice Film Festival

References

External links 

 Palme d'Or Winners, from 1976 to the present, by gross box-office
 Festival-cannes.com
 Cannes Film Festival IMDB

 
 
 
1946 establishments in France
Awards established in 1946
Awards for best film
French film awards
International film awards
Lists of films by award